Lindy Imgrund (born 6 March 1976) is an Australian sport shooter. She tied for 41st place in the women's 10 metre air rifle event at the 2000 Summer Olympics.

References

1976 births
Living people
ISSF rifle shooters
Australian female sport shooters
Olympic shooters of Australia
Shooters at the 2000 Summer Olympics
Commonwealth Games medallists in shooting
Commonwealth Games silver medallists for Australia
Shooters at the 1998 Commonwealth Games
20th-century Australian women
21st-century Australian women
Medallists at the 1998 Commonwealth Games